The Sorum-class seagoing tugboat, also known as Project 745P in Russian Coast Guard service, is a seagoing tug that is currently in service in the Russian Coast Guard and was in other services at one point. These vessels will perform the standard missions of a seagoing tug boat with other missions such as protecting and patrolling Russian maritime borders, enforcing navigational rules and law enforcement, search and rescue, and fisheries protection.

Design
The tugs are modified versions of the original Project 745. They are armed with two 30 mm guns giving them the ability to fire on surface, air, and ground targets and are equipped with the Kolonka-1 fire control system to control these weapons. They are equipped with electric motors, and diesel generators.

History
One seagoing tug was involved in an incident involving Greenpeace where the tug fired warning shots, and later seized a Greenpeace vessel after they attempted to board an oil rig in the Arctic in 2013.
Another Sorum-class tugboat rammed a Ukrainian tug in the Azov Sea on 25 November 2018.

See also
 List of ships of Russia by project number

References

Patrol vessels